Exo, officially known as Réseau de transport métropolitain (RTM), is a public transport system in Greater Montreal, including the Island of Montreal, Laval (Île Jésus), and communities along both the North Shore of the Mille Îles River and the South Shore of the St. Lawrence River. It was created on June 1, 2017, taking over from the Agence métropolitaine de transport. The RTM operates Montreal's commuter rail and metropolitan bus services, and is the second busiest such system in Canada after Toronto's GO Transit. In May 2018, the former Réseau de transport métropolitain (RTM) was branded as Exo.

Exo's territory is concurrent with Montreal Metropolitan Community limits, with the addition of the Kahnawake First Nations reserve and the city of Saint-Jérôme. It serves a population of approximately 4.1 million people who make more than 750,000 trips daily in the  area radiating from Montreal.

Exo's mandate includes the operation of Montreal's commuter rail service, which links the downtown core with communities as far west as Hudson, as far east as Mont-Saint-Hilaire, as far south as Candiac, and as far north as Saint-Jérôme and commuter buses formerly operated by local operators.

Partners in transport
Exo's parent agency, the Autorité régionale de transport métropolitain (ARTM), is charged with transportation planning for the Greater Montreal area.

Exo operates commuter train service as well as the bus service outside of the three main population centres of Greater Montreal. In these areas service is provided by the Société de Transport de Montréal on the Island of Montreal, the Société de Transport de Laval in Laval, and the Réseau de transport de Longueuil for the urban agglomeration of Longueuil.

Commuter rail

Exo's commuter trains are its highest-profile division. It has two types of trains: electric multiple unit (EMU) trains, used on the Deux-Montagnes line until its closure in 2020, and diesel-electric push-pull trains, used on all the others. Diesel trains through the tunnel were at one time restricted and are now prohibited; the diesel-powered trains of the Mont-Saint-Hilaire line, Via Rail and Amtrak all arrive at Central Station from the direction opposite the tunnel.

The Exo commuter trains operate on tracks owned by either Canadian National or Canadian Pacific. The Mont-Saint-Hilaire line run on CN trackage and operate out of Central Station, while the Vaudreuil-Hudson, Saint-Jérôme, and Candiac lines run on CP trackage and operate out of Lucien L'Allier terminus, beside the historic Windsor Station. The Saint-Jérôme line also runs on Canadian Pacific (CP) trackage and on exo' s own trackage between Sainte-Thérèse and Saint-Jérôme.

The Deux-Montagnes line, including trackage and all infrastructure, as well as the Mount Royal tunnel, is fully owned by the RTM.

Operation of all commuter rail was provided by contract to CN and CP (on their respective rail networks) until June 30, 2017. Operations were taken over by Bombardier Transportation beginning July 1, 2017, on an 8-year contract.

The train lines are integrated with the bus and Metro network maintained by the Société de transport de Montréal (STM).

List of commuter train lines

Fares 

As of July 1, 2022, the Autorité régionale de transport métropolitain (ARTM) which is responsible for the distribution of fares in the Greater Montreal area has designated 4 zones on its territory A, B, C and D. The Island of Montreal is under zone A. Laval and Longueuil are part of zone B. The northern and southern suburbs of Montreal (off-island) are part of zone C. Zone D is territory not under the authority of the ARTM but it is still responsible for the distribution of fares there as well. 

If a trip starts and ends on the island of Montreal, an all modes zone A fare is required. This includes all modes of public transit (i.e. bus, Metro, REM or Exo). If a trip leaves zone A (Montreal) then a fare for the corresponding zone is required. For example, a trip between Montreal and Laval will require an all modes AB fare. Fares are valid for 120 minutes after the first validation. There are no fare gates; instead, a proof-of-payment system is used, where fare inspectors randomly check tickets

All fares are available in a cheaper "reduced" category for children 6 to 17 years old, and seniors that are 65 or older. Additionally, monthly passes are available in a "student" category (which is cheaper than the regular fare but more than the reduced fare) for students 18 to 25 years old. To benefit from the reduced or student fares, the passenger must have a reduced-fare OPUS card with their name and photo on it. Travel on the commuter trains is free for anyone 5 and under as well as children 6 to 11 years old travelling with an adult.

Following the introduction of the OPUS, smart card system tickets and passes are now sold by automated vending machines at each station. The machines accept cash, credit and debit cards.  Purchases of more than $80 must be paid by cards. Tickets and passes are also sold at a few stores near the suburban stations. Consult the full list on the RTM's website. Passes are valid for a calendar month, and are normally on sale from the 20th of the previous month to the 5th of their month of validity. Passengers can also subscribe to OPUS+ which automatically debits the passenger's bank account or credit card and adds the pass to the passenger's OPUS card.

Rolling stock 
Exo has a variety of rolling stock, some of it acquired from GO Transit, the rest built specifically for it. There are a total of 256 cars and locomotives in the fleet.

Locomotives 

On January 28, 2022, Exo announced that it had ordered 10 Siemens Charger locomotives to replace the older F59PH locomotives in their fleet.

Passenger cars 

Current push-pull train coaches
 160 multi-level coaches  (3000 series cars) built between 2009 and 2011 by Bombardier Transportation (similar to NJ Transit's & MARC's multilevel fleet)
 22 bilevel VII coaches (2000 series cars), including 4 cab car; Built in 2004 by Bombardier Transportation (similar to Go Transit's Bilevel fleet)

Future coaches
In June 2017, the RTM ordered 24 bi-level coaches from CRRC Tangshan, with deliveries expected by 2020. In April 2019, the agency ordered an additional 20 coaches.
 In March 2018, the RTM announced that it would purchase another 20 2000 series cars.

Retired coaches
 24 single-level coaches (700 series cars); Built in 1989 by Bombardier Transportation and renovated in 2011-2013 (similar to NJ Transit's Comet II and Metro-North's Shoreliner I fleet)
 80 single-level coaches (originally from GO Transit); Built between 1967 and 1976 by Hawker-Siddeley Canada; retired following the arrival of the 160 multi-level cars.
 9 Canadian Vickers gallery cars (rebuilt from June 2005 to December 2006).
 58 Bombardier MR-90 electric multiple units used exclusively on the Deux-Montagnes line. Withdrawn in December 2020 due to the construction of the Réseau express métropolitain.

The 22 bilevel coaches are in operation on the Saint-Jérôme line. The AMT did not purchase additional bilevels as it sought to standardize its train fleet with the arrival of the multi-level coaches. However, 20 additional bilevels were purchased by the RTM in March 2018.

On December 18, 2007, the AMT awarded Bombardier a $386-million contract to build 160 multi-level commuter cars. These cars are based on NJ Transit's Multilevel series, and are able to enter the Mount Royal Tunnel, unlike the older GO-style BiLevel cars. They are numbered in the 3000s.

History 

Canadian National (CN) and Canadian Pacific (CP) had long operated commuter trains in the Montreal area, but by the 1980s, their services had dwindled to one route each. The Société de transport de la communauté urbaine de Montréal (STCUM), or Montreal Urban Community Transportation Corporation (MUCTC), which already managed Metro and bus services across the Island of Montreal, assumed management of CN's Deux-Montagnes commuter service and CP's Rigaud service in 1982 as the two railways began scaling back their services.

In 1997, management and financing of both lines was transferred to the newly created Agence métropolitaine de transport (AMT), which had been established to distribute funding and coordinate transportation planning among the numerous transit operators throughout the Greater Montreal Region. Later that year, the AMT inaugurated service between Blainville and Jean-Talon (now Parc) train station in Montreal's Park Extension district, connecting to the Metro at Parc . Originally, the service was designed to provide a temporary alternative for motorists from Laval and the North Shore of Montreal, while the Highway 117 Dufresne Bridge was being repaired. The service proved to be so popular that the AMT continued to fund it, and even extended a number of trains to the Lucien-L'Allier station downtown in 1999, and continues to provide off-peak daytime weekday service on this line.  The service was extended further north to Saint-Jérôme in 2007.

In 2000, the AMT inaugurated its service to McMasterville (which runs along a CN line), and later extended it to Mont-Saint-Hilaire in 2002.

In 2001, the AMT initiated a pilot project, launching service on a fifth line (using CP tracks) to Delson. This was later extended to Candiac in 2005. More information about the history of each line can be found in their respective articles.

In 2014, the AMT acquired the entire Deux-Montagnes line from CN, including the right of way, infrastructure, trackage, other railway equipment, grounds, curb lanes, rights in the Mount Royal tunnel and air rights, in a $97 million transaction.

On June 1, 2017, the AMT was disbanded to become the Réseau de transport métropolitain, then Exo, the new agency in charge of operating commuter rail and metropolitan bus services, while the Autorité régionale de transport became in charge of managing, integrating and planning public transportation in Greater Montreal.

On December 31, 2020, the Deux-Montagnes line was closed permanently, with the route from Montreal Central Station to Deux-Montagnes being converted into a section for the automated light metro service known as the Réseau express métropolitain.

Buses 

Exo runs multiple bus lines through its subsidiaries serving Montréal suburbs. One of them, the Express Chevrier 90, also called Express Terminus Centre-Ville 90 — operated by the RTL in Longueuil (using Van Hool AG300 buses) and links the Brossard-Chevrier Park and Ride in Brossard to the Downtown Terminus.

Exo operates all commuter bus services for the North Shore and South Shore suburbs, excepting the cities of Longueuil and Laval, which have their own transit agencies.

Ridership 
In 2018, Exo carried 174,710 passengers on a typical weekday — 77,210 on the trains and 97,500 by commuter bus, including adapted transport.

Future projects

Vaudreuil–Hudson Line 

To increase service on the Vaudreuil-Hudson Line, there are plans to add dedicated tracks for commuter trains. The current tracks are used by Exo under permission from Canadian Pacific.
On July 1, 2010, service to Rigaud was discontinued, due to Rigaud's reluctance to pay annual fees; the rail line now ends at Hudson.

Candiac Line 

The possibility of extending the Candiac Line to Saint-Jean-sur-Richelieu and Saint-Philippe was examined by the Quebec Government in 2014. In 2016, the study's final report rejected that option, citing longer travel times by train for people in the area.

Deux-Montagnes Line 

Originally planned by mid-2023, then delayed until late 2024, the Deux-Montagnes Line is being converted into a light metro automated system (Réseau express métropolitain); it is no longer part of Exo's commuter railway system.

As of May 11, 2020, as work on the Réseau express métropolitain intensified, the Mount Royal Tunnel was no longer available to Exo trains. As a result, the Mascouche and Deux-Montagnes lines terminate at Ahuntsic and Bois-Franc stations respectively. (On the Mascouche line, two trains a day continue to Central Station via a bypass through the Côte-Saint-Luc yards and the CN main line through Saint-Henri, a detour of about 54 minutes.) On December 31, 2020, the Deux-Montagnes line permanently closed to commuter rail service as the Réseau express métropolitain project continues.

See also 

 Autorité régionale de transport métropolitain
 Public transport in Canada

References

External links 
 

 
Railway companies established in 2017
Standard gauge railways in Canada
1859 establishments in Canada
1996 establishments in Quebec
2017 establishments in Quebec